Euptera amieti, or Amiet's euptera, is a butterfly in the family Nymphalidae. It is found in eastern Nigeria, Cameroon, Gabon and the eastern part of the Democratic Republic of the Congo. The habitat consists of forests.

The larvae feed on Englerophytum species.

References

Butterflies described in 1998
Euptera